Paul Dean Holt (born March 30, 1936 in Sweetwater, Tennessee) is a retired NASCAR Winston Cup driver and a competitor at the 1968 Fireball 300.

Career
Holt started an average of 23rd place and finished an average of 20th. Holt also failed to lead a lap but eventually retired at the age of 41 with $19,192 ($ when adjusted for inflation) in total career earnings. NASCAR insider Brock Beard would find out after extensive research about Paul Dean Holt's three career last-place finishes.

At the 1968 NASCAR Rookie of the Year ceremonies, Holt finished in third place behind Charlie Glotzbach and Donnie Allison (the winner of the Rookie of the Year award). Dodge and Ford vehicles were considered to the staple manufacturers of Holt's career.

Holt's best track accomplishments was at Richmond International Raceway where he finished an average of 18th place; his least favorite track was Martinsville Speedway where a finish of 32nd place was routine for him.

References

1936 births
Living people
People from Sweetwater, Tennessee
Racing drivers from Tennessee
NASCAR drivers